Kolbjørn Fjeld (4 June 1901 – 4 May 1978) was a Norwegian librarian and publisher. He was born in Eidskog. Fjeld worked for the library Deichmanske bibliotek from 1919 to 1933. He graduated as a master of science from the Columbia University in 1930. From 1933 to 1971 he chaired the publishing house Tiden Norsk Forlag (except during World War II, when the occupants had the company closed).

References

1901 births
1978 deaths
People from Eidskog
Librarians from Oslo
Norwegian publishers (people)
Columbia University alumni